Cards Pond, or Card Pond, is a coastal lagoon in South Kingstown, Washington County, Rhode Island, United States.

Coastal lagoon
It is one of nine coastal lagoons (often referred to as "salt ponds") in southern Rhode Island. According to the Rhode Island Sea Grant program, "[i]ts breachway is only intermittently open to the sea", and it receives large quantities of freshwater from Moonstone Stream; only two other salt ponds, Point Judith and Greenhill, have significant streams flowing into them. It is partially within the Trustom Pond National Wildlife Refuge, which is inhabited by over 360 species of animals.

Watershed
It has been classified as "non-tidal except when breached by storms". The water directly receives about 51,196,553 gallons of precipitation per year, and at least 1,592,165 gallons of daily groundwater flow. Cards Pond, like others in the region, was "formed after the recession of the glaciers 12,000 years ago". Nests of piping plovers, which are federally designated as a threatened species, have been documented within the watershed.

Flooding
The land surrounding Cards Pond is low-lying, and particularly vulnerable to severe flooding. However, compared to other ponds in the region, damage from future storms is projected to be minimal. It typically breaches around 9 times each year, spilling into the Block Island Sound. When the pond threatens to flood a nearby road or surrounding houses, a breach is intentionally created by the U.S. Fish and Wildlife Service.

See also

List of lakes in Rhode Island
Geography of Rhode Island

References

External links

Card Pond map

Lagoons of Washington County, Rhode Island
South Kingstown, Rhode Island